Tlokwe Local Municipality (before February 2007, Potchefstroom Local Municipality) was a local municipality in Dr Kenneth Kaunda District Municipality, North West Province, South Africa. The seat was Potchefstroom. After the municipal elections on 3 August 2016 it was merged into the larger JB Marks Local Municipality.

The most widely accepted theory on the origin of the name Potchefstroom is that the name is composed of three words: Potgieter, chef and stroom. The first syllable is that of Potgieter, the second from the fact that he was a "chef" or a leader of the emigrants, and the third signifying the Mooi River. The complete name "Potgieter" was gradually shortened to "Pot".

In The News
In February 2013, then mayor of Tlokwe, prof. Annette Combrink declared that she would refuse to use the new official vehicle that was delivered to her. It was a customized Mercedes-Benz C350 CDI, worth R736,000.-, that the ANC ruled council had ordered in July 2012 for the previous mayor Maphetle Maphetle. Combrink represents the opposition Democratic Alliance but was elected mayor due to disagreements in the ANC led council. She declared to be quite happy to use her nine-year-old Volkswagen Passat instead, in view of the poverty in the municipality. The ANC declared that they plan to unseat the mayor as soon as possible.

Main places
The 2001 census divided the municipality into the following main places:

Rivers 
 Ensel Spruit
 Kromdraai Spruit
 Loop Spruit
 Mooi River
 Rooikraal Spruit
 Vaal River

Dams 
 Boskop Dam
 Klipdrift Dam
 Modder Dam
 Poortjies Dam
 Potchefstroom Dam

Politics 
The municipal council consisted of fifty-two members elected by mixed-member proportional representation. Twenty-six councillors were elected by first-past-the-post voting in twenty-six wards, while the remaining twenty-six were chosen from party lists so that the total number of party representatives was proportional to the number of votes received. In the election of 18 May 2011 the African National Congress (ANC) won a majority of thirty seats in the council.
The following table shows the results of the election.

References

External links
 Official website

Local municipalities of the Dr Kenneth Kaunda District Municipality